Nicola Guerra (2 May 1865, Naples – 5 February 1942, Cernobbio aged 76) was an Italian dancer, choreographer and ballet master.

Trained in dance by a student of Carlo Blasis, he was primo ballerino in many Italian and foreign theaters and performed in New York in The Black Crook.

A dancer and ballet master at the Vienna State Opera (1896–1901), he directed the ballet of the Budapest Opera (1902-1915), then the Paris Opera Ballet (1927–1929) and finally the school dance of the Teatro dell'Opera di Roma (1931–1932).

External links 
 Nicola Guerra on Data.bnf.fr

19th-century Neapolitan people
Italian male ballet dancers
Italian choreographers
Ballet masters
1865 births
1942 deaths